Howard William Jaffe (February 16, 1919 – May 13, 2002) was an American geologist and mineralogist. He is a pioneer in the study of the crystal chemistry of rock-forming minerals and of the link between the structural attributes and the physical and chemical properties of minerals.

Jaffe studied at Brooklyn College in New York, obtained B.A. in 1942. After graduating from college, he worked for the U.S. Bureau of Mines between 1942 and 1957 in a varieties of positions to assist Allied forces in wars. He worked for Union Carbide Corporation on developing the growth technique of YAG crystals, which is later widely used for laser surgery. He joined the faculty of the Department of Geology at University of Massachusetts Amherst in 1965 without a graduate degree. He stayed at Amherst until his retirement in 1991. During these years, he was visiting professor at University of Geneva, eventually obtaining his D.Sc. in geology in 1972.

The mineral species jaffeite is named after him since 1989. His wife is Elizabeth Boudreau Jaffe, also a geologist and a collaborator, passed away in 1999. They have three children, Andrew, Stephen, and Marina.

Bibliography

See also
 Hatten Yoder
 Yttrium aluminium garnet

References

1919 births
2002 deaths
Brooklyn College alumni
University of Geneva alumni
Academic staff of the University of Geneva
University of Massachusetts Amherst faculty
American geologists
Textbook writers
United States Bureau of Mines personnel